Canarium patentinervium is a tree of tropical Asia in the incense tree family Burseraceae. The specific epithet  is from the Latin meaning "spreading nerves", referring to the leaf veins.

Description
Its smooth bark is coloured grey. The twigs are brownish.

Distribution and habitat
Canarium patentinervium grows naturally in Sumatra, Peninsular Malaysia and Borneo. Its habitat is dipterocarp and kerangas forests from sea-level to  altitude.

References

patentinervium
Trees of Sumatra
Trees of Peninsular Malaysia
Trees of Borneo
Plants described in 1861
Taxonomy articles created by Polbot
Taxa named by Friedrich Anton Wilhelm Miquel